"We Own the Night" is a song by British-Irish boy band The Wanted, released as the fourth single from their third studio album, Word of Mouth (2013). The single was released on 11 August 2013, with an impact date of 1 September 2013. The song was written and produced by Nasri and Adam Messinger of The Messengers along with Sir Nolan.

Music video
The music video directed by Frank Borin premiered on 11 August 2013, at a total length of three minutes and thirty-seven seconds. It features The Wanted in a pub, dancing with their friends and drinking alcohol. Nathan Sykes is seen sitting at the piano, Tom Parker is seen playing the acoustic guitar, Max George is seen socialising with a group of girls, and Jay McGuiness and Siva Kaneswaran are at the bar, talking to the barmaid and dancing. The video has since gathered over 48 million views on Vevo.

Track listing
 Digital download
 "We Own the Night" (Main) – 3:25

 "We Own the Night" – the Remixes
 "We Own the Night" (Chainsmokers Extended) – 4:20

 "We Own the Night" (Chainsmokers Instrumental) – 4:19
 "We Own the Night" (Dannic Extended) – 5:09
 "We Own the Night" (Dannic Radio Edit) – 2:58
 "We Own the Night" (Dannic Instrumental) – 5:09
 "We Own the Night" (Ivan Gomez Extended Mix) – 6:51
 "We Own the Night" (Ivan Gomez Radio Edit) – 3:37
 "We Own the Night" (Ivan Gomes Instrumental) – 6:53

Chart performance
"We Own the Night" debuted at number ten on the UK Singles Chart, becoming the band's ninth top ten single and their fourth consecutive from Word of Mouth. At The X Factor on 6 September 2013, it was performed by all five members of the group and it became  The Wanted's first song to chart on the Billboard Hot 100 and the Canadian Hot 100 since their song "I Found You" back in December 2012 and January 2013, peaking at 94 and 51, making it their fourth and sixth entry into the Billboard Hot 100 and the Canadian Hot 100 respectively. It also peaked at number 40 in Australia and number 13 in the Republic of Ireland.

Charts

References

The Wanted songs
2013 singles
2013 songs
Dance-pop songs
Electropop songs
Songs written for films
Songs written by Nasri (musician)
Songs written by Adam Messinger
Songs written by Sir Nolan
Mercury Records singles